The Division of IT Convergence Engineering was founded in March 2009, and will be funded by the Korean Ministry of Education, Science and Technology as a WCU (World Class University) Program. The comprehensive nature of POSTECH’s Division of IT Convergence Engineering, combined with POSTECH’s high quality faculty, facilities, and industrial relationships, makes this division an ideal research environment for students as well as experienced researchers.

History

Structure
 Autonomics
The essence of autonomics is to manage business, system, and technical complexity. This requires new developments that enable components and systems to adapt to changing user needs, environmental conditions, and business goals. Adaptation requires context-aware, intelligent decision-making that orchestrates behavior. Supporting technologies include machine learning and reasoning, control theory, information and data modeling, ontology modeling, and semantic reasoning. 
 Communications&Network
In order to support autonomic orchestration, new protocols and data representation methods for ubiquitous systems and applications must be developed. An emphasis on low power consumption and the efficient use of resources is important for developing new nano- and bio-sensors. However, the dream of U-Health and U-Environment applications will never become a reality if smart applications are connected by dumb networks. Therefore, the embedding of increased cognitive abilities in networks and network devices is of paramount importance.
 Nanosensors & Systems
Nano-sensors and systems are critical for realizing U-Health and U-Environment applications. Research will concentrate on scaling nano-devices and -systems as well as improving their scalability and enhancing the reliability of different nanostructure-based communication and data processing methods. Modeling such devices is critical for new bio-medical applications.
 Biotechnology
Nano-sensors and systems are critical for realizing U-Health and U-Environment applications. Research will concentrate on scaling nano-devices and -systems as well as improving their scalability and enhancing the reliability of different nanostructure-based communication and data processing methods. Modeling such devices is critical for new bio-medical applications.

References

Educational institutions established in 2009
Research institutes in South Korea
Pohang University of Science and Technology
Engineering universities and colleges in South Korea
2009 establishments in South Korea